Ronald Sylvester Slay (born June 29, 1981) is an American professional basketball player. He was Southeastern Conference player of the year as a senior at Tennessee.

College career
Ron Slay played for Pearl-Cohn High School in Nashville, Tennessee before transferring to prep powerhouse Oak Hill Academy and then heading to the University of Tennessee.  As a freshman in 1999–2000, Slay averaged 9.7 points and 4.4 rebounds per game as the Volunteers went 26–7 and won the SEC.  In the 2000 NCAA Tournament, Slay and the Vols made their first Sweet Sixteen appearance since 1981.  The next season, Slay upped his averages to 12.9 points and 5.3 rebounds per game.  He was named third team all-conference and team MVP.

Slay was poised to have another strong year as a junior, as he became a regular starter for the Volunteers and again showed improvement in his production, raising his averages to 14.8 points and 6.3 rebounds per game.  However, Slay tore his anterior cruciate ligament and was limited to 14 games.  After rehabbing during the offseason, Slay had a breakout year as a senior.  He averaged 21.2 points and 7.8 rebounds per game and was named the Associated Press SEC Player of the Year and a third team All-American.

Professional career
Following the conclusion of his college career, Slay went undrafted in the 2003 NBA Draft.  He took part in the Orlando Summer League as a member of the Miami Heat's entry, however he did not make the team.  He instead signed with Galatasaray Café Crown of the Turkish Basketball League.  This began an international basketball career that would take Slay to Israel, Venezuela, Italy, Spain, and Puerto Rico.  Slay also played a season for the Asheville Altitude of the NBDL, where he was named second team all-league.

On September 17, 2012, Slay signed with Scafati Basket of Italy's Legadue. In the summer of 2013, he signed with Châlons Reims.

In August 2014, he signed with Benfica of the Liga Portuguesa de Basquetebol for the 2014–15 season.

Honours
Benfica
 Portuguese League: 2014–15
 Portuguese Cup: 2014–15
 Portuguese SuperCup: 2014
 Hugo dos Santos Cup: 2014–15
 António Pratas Trophy: 2014

The Basketball Tournament (TBT)
In the summer of 2017, Slay competed in The Basketball Tournament on ESPN for the City of Gods.  In their first-round matchup, Slay scored 14 points in 21 minutes in the City of Gods' 88-86 loss to Gael Nation, a team composed of Iona College basketball alum.

References

External links
Châlons Reims profile
Eurobasket profile
NBDL statistics
FIBA.com profile

1981 births
Living people
A.S. Junior Pallacanestro Casale players
All-American college men's basketball players
American expatriate basketball people in Bulgaria
American expatriate basketball people in France
American expatriate basketball people in Israel
American expatriate basketball people in Italy
American expatriate basketball people in Portugal
American expatriate basketball people in Spain
American expatriate basketball people in Switzerland
American expatriate basketball people in Turkey
American expatriate basketball people in Venezuela
American men's basketball players
Asheville Altitude players
Basketball players from Nashville, Tennessee
BC Levski Sofia players
Caciques de Humacao players
Champagne Châlons-Reims Basket players
Cocodrilos de Caracas players
Galatasaray S.K. (men's basketball) players
Juvecaserta Basket players
Lille Métropole BC players
Lugano Tigers players
Maccabi Givat Shmuel players
Pallacanestro Varese players
Power forwards (basketball)
S.L. Benfica basketball players
S.S. Felice Scandone players
Scafati Basket players
Tennessee Volunteers basketball players
Victoria Libertas Pallacanestro players
United States men's national basketball team players